This is a list of members of the South Australian Legislative Council from 1885 to 1888.

This was the first Legislative Council to be affected by the amendments to the Act, which provided for the Colony to be divided into four districts: (1) Central; (2) Southern; (3) North-Eastern and (4) Northern, with six members in each division; one third of each to be replaced in rotation every three years. Previously, the whole colony acted as one electoral district "The Province" with one third replaced at General Elections every four years. This and the following election (1888–1891) are notable for having members elected under both systems.

References
Parliament of South Australia — Statistical Record of the Legislature

Members of South Australian parliaments by term
19th-century Australian politicians